Egmore taluk is a taluk of the city district of Chennai in the Indian state of Tamil Nadu. It was formed in December 2013 from parts of the Egmore-Nungambakkam taluk. It comprises the neighbourhoods of Egmore and Nungambakkam.

References

General
 Chennai district website

Specific

Taluks of Chennai district